The Long Dock Tunnel is a freight rail  tunnel in Jersey City, New Jersey that is part of the  North Jersey Shared Assets Area and used by CSX Transportation on the National Docks Secondary. The single track (formerly dual track) tunnel runs through Bergen Hill, a section of the lower New Jersey Palisades in Hudson County.

History

The tunnel was built under the oversight of engineer James P. Kirkwood and was started in 1856 and opened in 1861, costing 57 lives to build. The new tunnel formed became route for both the Erie and Delaware-Lackawanna railroads to reach their respective stations, the Pavonia Terminal and Hoboken Terminal, located on the North River (Hudson River).

Eight shafts,  in depth were sunk down from atop the Palisades to reach the tunnel.

In 1910 the Erie Railroad replaced the Long Dock Tunnel with the Erie Cut, though primarily for use by passenger trains. Erie freight trains continued to use the tunnel as do freight railroads to this day.

The northwestern portal is just northwest of where Kennedy Boulevard passes over New Jersey State Route 139. The southeastern portal is near State Route 139 between where it intersects Palisade Avenue and passes over Interstate 78. Part of the viaduct which carried trains to the yards and the terminals is parallel to Boyle Plaza (the entrance and exit roads for the Holland Tunnel) and now serves as an access road to Newport as the current 11th Street.

See also
List of bridges, tunnels, and cuts in Hudson County, New Jersey
List of Hudson County railroad terminals
Timeline of Jersey City area railroads
List of ferries across the Hudson River to New York City

References

External links
 Bergen Tunnel portal photo
 mine data
 Bergen Waldo tunnels

Erie Railroad tunnels
Railroad tunnels in New Jersey
Transportation in Jersey City, New Jersey
CSX Transportation tunnels
Norfolk Southern Railway tunnels
Tunnels completed in 1860
Tunnels in Hudson County, New Jersey